Neutral Bay Beach or Hayes Street Beach as it is also known is the only beach in the suburb of Neutral Bay on the Lower North Shore in Sydney. It can be accessed from Hayes Street via a small laneway near the news-agency. The beach itself is 50m long at low tide with a width of 10m. The beach is backed and surrounded by various apartment blocks and a small raised grassed area to the left. The area is dog-friendly and allows off-leash play. The beach is also commonly used for sun-lounging, fishing and swimming.

Pollution
Three storm-water drains are located close to the beach and during rainy periods release much plastic pollution and chemical waste. It has been found that the drains often release pathogens associated with human waste. The public is advised to not use the beach during these periods.

Facilities
The beach has a cold shower and waste bin at its exit and a small watercraft storage system to the left of the beach.

References

 Gibson, J. (2019). Improving the Water Quality at Hayes Street Beach, Neutral Bay. [ebook] Neutral Bay: N O R T H S Y D N E Y C O U N C I L, pp.1-2. Available at: http://MM01_Improving_the_Water_Quality_at_Hayes_Street_Beach_Neutral_Bay.pdf [Accessed 2 Apr. 2019].
 (2019). N/A. [ebook] Neutral Bay: Sydney Water, p.1. Available at: https://www.legislation.nsw.gov.au/maps/c558b798-24de-e423-92df-c297f61f5519/SWMAP0054_SW_071.pdf [Accessed 3 Apr. 2019].
 Environment.nsw.gov.au. (2019). Sydney Harbour - Beachwatch Daily Bulletins. [online] Available at: https://www.environment.nsw.gov.au/beachapp/SydneyBulletin.aspx?NoMobile [Accessed 3 Apr. 2019].
 Weule, G. (2019). Plastic and how it affects our oceans. [online] ABC News. Available at: https://www.abc.net.au/news/science/2017-02-27/plastic-and-plastic-waste-explained/8301316 [Accessed 4 Apr. 2019].

Neutral Bay, New South Wales
Beaches of New South Wales